Igor Yevgenyevich Surovikin (born January 17, 1962) is a Russian professional football coach and a former player. As of July 2009, he works as an assistant manager with FC Rotor Volgograd.

Surovikin played for FC Rotor and coached for the club after retiring from playing.

References

External links
 Career summary at KLISF

1962 births
Living people
Soviet footballers
Soviet expatriate footballers
Expatriate footballers in Finland
FC Rotor Volgograd players
FC SKA Rostov-on-Don players
Russian football managers
Association football midfielders
Soviet expatriate sportspeople in Finland